The Piraeus Municipal Theatre is a neoclassical building built on plans by the architect  and was opened on 9 April 1895.

The theatre has a 600-seat capacity and is located in the centremost place of Piraeus.

References

External links
Inside the Piraeus Municipal Theatre

Theatres in Greece
Buildings and structures in Piraeus
Tourist attractions in Attica
Theatres completed in 1895
Neoclassical architecture in Greece